Grishina is the name of several rural localities in Russia:
Grishina, Arkhangelsk Oblast, a village in Plesetsky District, Arkhangelsk Oblast
Grishina, Perm Krai, a village in Krasnovishersky District, Perm Krai